Trilok Singh (born 13 June 1933) is an Indian gymnast. He competed in eight events at the 1964 Summer Olympics.

References

1933 births
Living people
Indian male artistic gymnasts
Olympic gymnasts of India
Gymnasts at the 1964 Summer Olympics
Place of birth missing (living people)